Guitar for the Practicing Musician was a guitar magazine published in the United States by Cherry Lane Music from 1982 to 1999.  The magazine was published monthly. In 1992, it was the most popular music publication at newsstands, selling 740,000 issues over a six-month period. It was popular for publishing songs with guitar (adding bass later on) in both standard notation and tablature, as well as interviews and instructional columns. Editors and writers included HP Newquist, Andy Aledort, Kenn Chipkin, Pete Prown, Bob Gulla, Rich Maloof, and Bruce Pollock.

From 1993 until its shutdown, it was known simply as GUITAR Magazine.

Issue transcriptions

See also
 Guitar Player magazine 
 List of defunct American magazines

References

Monthly magazines published in the United States
Music magazines published in the United States
Defunct magazines published in the United States
Guitar magazines
Magazines established in 1982
Magazines disestablished in 1999
Magazines published in New York City